Frederic Charles Breidenbach  (September 21, 1876 – May 21, 1955) served as Mayor of Newark, New Jersey from 1922 to 1925.

Biography
He was born in Newark, New Jersey in 1875. He served as Mayor of Newark, New Jersey from 1922 to 1925.

He died on Saturday, May 21, 1955, at the age of 78 at the Martland Medical Center in Newark, New Jersey.

References

Mayors of Newark, New Jersey
1876 births
1955 deaths